Australothis volatilis, also known as the fuzzweed moth, is a species of moth in the family Noctuidae. It is endemic to New Zealand. This species has been classified as critically endangered by the Department of Conservation.

Taxonomy 
This species was discovered by Brian H. Patrick in Central Otago in 1989. It was first described by him and his colleague M. Matthews in 1998.

Distribution 
A. volatilis  is endemic to New Zealand. It has been found in only six sites in Central Otago and the Mackenzie Basin.

Host plants 

The larvae of this species feed on Vittadinia species. The natural host of A. volatilis appears to be the white fuzzweed herb Vittadinia australis. This plant is also endemic to New Zealand and is itself in need of conservation. The caterpillars of A. volatilis feed on the flowerheads, leaves and developing seeds of the plant. Larvae have also been seen feeding on the exotic species Vittadinia gracilis but it is unknown whether this plant provides the necessary nutrients to the larvae to ensure their successful maturation.

Conservation status
This moth is classified under the New Zealand Threat Classification system as being Nationally Critical.

References

Heliothinae
Moths of New Zealand
Endemic fauna of New Zealand
Moths described in 1998
Endangered biota of New Zealand
Endemic moths of New Zealand